Darren Lawrence Clarke (born March 18, 1981) is a former Major League Baseball right-handed pitcher who played for the Colorado Rockies. After graduating from high school, the Rockies selected him in the 33rd round of the 1999 Major League Baseball draft, but he did not sign with them, opting instead to attend South Florida Community College (SFCC). He was again selected by the Rockies in the 35th round of the 2000 Major League Baseball draft and was signed by them May 7, 2001, following his sophomore year at SFCC.

Clarke spent the 2001 season as a starting pitcher for the Casper Rockies of the Pioneer League, compiling a 3–6 win–loss record and a 6.02 ERA in 14 starts. In , he was with the Rockies' Northwest League affiliate, Tri-City Dust Devils where he was 4–3 with a 6.98 ERA. In , he was in the starting rotation of the Asheville Tourists of the South Atlantic League. In 27 games (25 starts) for the Tourists, he was 8–6 with a 3.83 ERA.

In , the Rockies converted Clarke into a relief pitcher and he began the season with their new California League affiliate in Modesto, but was placed on the disabled list on April 7. When he returned from the disabled list, he made a rehabilitation assignment to Tri-City, where in 12 appearances, he posted a 0.64 ERA and 3 saves for the Dust Devils. He returned to Modesto on July 20 and made 5 relief appearances (0–0, 9.00 ERA) before a recurrence of the elbow injury ended his season on August 30.

He was 1–1 with the Nuts with 5 saves and a 1.35 ERA. His performance earned him a place on the California League All-Star team, but he was unable to pitch due to injury.

In , Clarke began the season in the bullpen of the Double-A Tulsa Drillers of the Texas League. The Rockies called him up to their big league roster where he made his major league debut on May 18 against the Kansas City Royals.

Clarke was not offered a new contract by the Rockies and became a free agent on December 12, 2007.

References

External links

MLB.com player info page
The Baseball Cube player page

1981 births
Living people
South Florida Panthers baseball players
Colorado Rockies players
Baseball players from San Diego
Major League Baseball pitchers
Tri-City Dust Devils players
Asheville Tourists players
Modesto Nuts players
Tulsa Drillers players
Peoria Javelinas players
Henry B. Plant High School alumni